Zinc finger protein 318 is a protein that in humans is encoded by the ZNF318 gene.

References

Further reading

External links 
 

Transcription factors